Stratford-on-Odéon was both a literary circle and James Joyce's affectionate nickname for the Rue de l'Odéon in Paris's Left Bank, its two bookstores (Adrienne Monnier's La Maison des Amis des Livres and Sylvia Beach's Shakespeare and Company; Monnier and Beach thought of it as Odéonia) and the "coterie of emergent Anglophone writers surrounding them".

Ernest Hemingway, James Joyce, Ezra Pound, Gertrude Stein and F. Scott Fitzgerald were among the famous writers who comprised "Stratford-on-Odéon".

Monnier offered advice and encouragement when Beach founded the bookstore in 1919. During the 1920s, the shops owned by Beach and Monnier were located across from each other. Both bookstores became gathering places for French, British, and American writers. By sponsoring readings and encouraging informal conversations among authors and readers, the two women brought to bookselling a domesticity and hospitality that encouraged friendship as well as cultural exchange. Joyce used Shakespeare and Company as his office.

The store and its literary inhabitants are mentioned in Hemingway's 1964 posthumously published memoir A Moveable Feast. It became a hub for British and American modernists. Beach published James Joyce's Ulysses in 1922. Their meeting place was destroyed during World War II.

See also
Adrienne Monnier and La Maison des Amis des Livres

References

External links 

Literary circles
Literary societies
James Joyce
Ernest Hemingway
Ezra Pound
Gertrude Stein
F. Scott Fitzgerald
Ulysses (novel)